Homalodotheriidae is an extinct family comprising four genera of notoungulate mammals known from the Late Eocene (Tinguirirican) through Late Miocene (Chasicoan) of Argentina and Chile in South America.

References 

Toxodonts
Eocene mammals
Oligocene mammals
Miocene mammals of South America
Eocene first appearances
Miocene extinctions
Prehistoric mammal families